Oppum is a quarter (Stadtteil) of Krefeld, a city in North Rhine-Westphalia, Germany.

Oppum probably developed as a Frankish farmer settlement. Its existence was first documented in the year 1072.

References

Krefeld